National Geographic is a British pay television channel that features documentaries produced by the National Geographic Society. It features some programming similar to that on the Discovery Channel such as nature and science documentaries. The channel was launched in Europe in September 1997 and time shared initially with the failing NBC Europe until NBC Europe's demise in 1998, at which point it began timesharing with Fox Kids (in the UK, replacing the failed first iteration of Sky 2); with analogue transmission of the channel ending, and the sale of Fox Kids to Disney, timesharing was eventually superseded by 24-hour broadcasting. It was later launched worldwide including in Asia and the United States. Today, the channel is available in over 143 countries, seen in more than 160 million homes and in 25 languages.

It is owned by a company called the "NGC-UK Partnership", which initially was jointly owned by the National Geographic Society and British Sky Broadcasting (BSkyB), but in 2006, Sky's parent company News Corporation (now The Walt Disney Company) purchased 25 percent of the stake in the partnership, followed by the acquisition of BSkyB's remaining 50 percent stake by its sister company, the Fox Entertainment Group.

This includes an English-language version for the United Kingdom, Ireland, Malta and Iceland. It also includes Dutch, Italian, Norwegian and Turkish speaking channels among others. The channel's musical signature is the Elmer Bernstein composed theme that has also appeared on the National Geographic broadcast-TV specials.

Company 
The channel is owned by the NGC-UK Partnership, which was formed in 1997 as a joint venture between National Geographic Television & Film, a division of the National Geographic Society and British Sky Broadcasting through its Sky Ventures division. The NGS provides programming expertise, while BSkyB provides its expertise on distribution, marketing, commercial and advertising sales. The partnership builds and operates National Geographic channels and services across Europe. It is headquartered in London. In December 2006, News Corporation purchased 25 percent of the Society's stake in the company. This meant that BSkyB owned half company, while the National Geographic Society and News Corp held 25 percent share each. In December 2007, BSkyB sold its stake in the partnership to the Fox Entertainment Group, through its Fox Networks Group subsidiary.

HD feed 
The channel launched its own high-definition feed on 22 May 2006 on Sky. The channel joined Virgin Media's cable TV line-up on 30 July 2009. On 5 August 2009, it was also made available on UPC Ireland's cable TV service. The HD version available in the UK and Ireland was not originally a simulcast of the standard definition version of the National Geographic Channel, with some of the content coming from Rush HD, however from 1 December 2010 National Geographic Channel HD became a simulcast feed.

Programmes 

 Air Crash Investigation
 Ape Man
 Banged Up Abroad
 Be the Creature
 Big Bang
 Britain's Greatest Machines with Chris Barrie
 Built for the Kill
 Car S.O.S.
 Doomsday Preppers
 Drain the Oceans
 End Day
 Escape Tech
 Explorations Powered by Duracell
 Explorer
 Family Guns
 Gordon Ramsay: Uncharted
 Gospel of Judas
 Highway Thru Hell
 Hollywood Science
 Hunter Hunted
 Interpol Investigates
 Is It Real?
 Living Wild
 Megacities
 Megafactories
 MegaStructures
 Mysteries of the Deep
 Naked Science
 No Borders
 Planet Football
 Planet Mechanics
 Predators at War
 Rough Trades
 Scam City
 Science of the Bible
 Seconds From Disaster
 Situation Critical
 Storm Stories
 Strange Days on Planet Earth
 Strippers: cars for cash
 Taboo
 The Dog Whisperer
 The Living Edens
 Thrill Zone
 Thunder Beasts
 Totally Wild
 Trading Faces
 What Would Happen If...?
 Wicked Tuna
 World of Wildlife

Continuity / Voiceovers 

Rob Jarvis, who is well known as Eddie in Hustle is one of the two main male promo voices for this channel, along with Adam Longworth from XFM radio station.

See also 
 National Geographic Channel
 National Geographic Channel Australia & New Zealand
 List of National Geographic Channel programs
 National Geographic Society

References

External links
 Official site
 Official site Ireland (previously active)
 National Geographic Channels International

Television channels in the United Kingdom
UK and Ireland
Disney television channels in the United Kingdom
Television channels and stations established in 1997